Bahhas (also Romanized as Bahhās̄, Baḩās̄, and Baḩḩās̄) is a village in Hoseyni Rural District, in the Central District of Shadegan County, Khuzestan Province, Iran. At the 2006 census, its population was 225, in 31 families.

References 

Populated places in Shadegan County